The State Museum of Toys is one of the most unique museum in Kyiv, containing more than 15000 exhibits that highlight the history of Ukrainian toy production - industrial design toys, unique and original handmade toys and extremely colorful collection of Ukrainian folk toys.

The idea of creating the museum of toys arose in 1933 when according to Decree of CPSU on August 26, 1933 No.202 "Production of Children's Toys" initiated the creation of Toy Museums in Moscow, Tbilisi, Tashkent and Kharkiv. In 1936 in Kyiv was opened permanent exhibition of toys that began a unique collection of the future museum of toys.

The museum has three permanent exhibitions. This is the history of toys, “Ukrainian folk toy” and original works that are unique.

External links
 Museums' site (Ukrainian)
 The State Museum of Toys

Museums in Kyiv
Museums established in 2005
Doll museums
Toy museums
Tourist attractions in Kyiv